The 2020 Montana Secretary of State election was held on November 3, 2020, to elect the secretary of state of the U.S. state of Montana. Incumbent Republican Montana Secretary of State Corey Stapleton was elected in 2016 with 55.5% of the vote. Stapleton has announced he would not seek re-election, instead running unsuccessfully in the Republican primary for the open U.S. House seat in Montana.

Republican primary

Candidates

Nominee
Christi Jacobsen, chief of staff to Montana Secretary of State Corey Stapleton

Eliminated in primary
Bowen Greenwood, clerk for the Montana State Supreme Court
Brad Johnson, Montana Public Service Commissioner and former Montana Secretary of State (2005–2009)
Kurt Johnson
Forrest Mandeville, state representative
Scott Sales, president of the Montana State Senate

Declined
Corey Stapleton, incumbent Montana Secretary of State

Results

Democratic primary

Candidates

Declared
Bryce Bennett, state senator

Results

General election

Predictions

Polling

Results

Results by county

See also
 2020 Montana elections
 2020 United States presidential election in Montana
 2020 Montana gubernatorial election
 2020 United States Senate election in Montana
 2020 United States House of Representatives election in Montana

References

Notes

External links
Official campaign websites
 Bryce Bennett (D) for Secretary of State 
 Christi Jacobsen (R) for Secretary of State

2020 Montana elections
Montana Secretary of State elections
Montana